Sud-Est (Romanian for "South-East") is a magazine from Chișinău, Moldova. Valentina Tăzlauanu is the editor in chief. It is published quarterly and covers topics on culture and civilization.

References

External links
  

Magazines established in 1977
Romanian-language magazines
Magazines published in Moldova
Cultural magazines
Mass media in Chișinău
Quarterly magazines
1977 establishments in Romania